Pyar Ali Allana was a politician from Karachi, Sindh, Pakistan. Pyar Ali Allana was a former member of the Federal Parliament and Sindh's Education Minister. He was son of Ghulam Ali Allana, friend and confidant of Muhammad Ali Jinnah. Pyar Ali Allana was one of the founders of the Movement for Restoration of Democracy (MRD) and a member of the Pakistan Peoples Party. Ali Allana was 68 years old when he died on December 30, 2004.

References

Year of birth missing
2004 deaths
Pakistani Ismailis
1930s births
Pakistani people of Gujarati descent
St. Patrick's High School, Karachi alumni